Red Iron or Iron Red may refer to:
 Iron(III) oxide, a common red oxide of iron
 Red Iron, an iron oxide-based ceramic colorant
 Rust, rusted, or rusty iron 
 Iron Ore, which may be Hematite (literally, blood-like stone), Taconite, or other types red-colored iron ore
 A particular place, street, or business name in the Mesabi Range or similar iron ore mining region
 Structural steel, because it is often manufactured with no rust protection or with only a red oxide coating
 A business or service name for organizations that sell or install structural steel
 Red Iron Lake, a lake group in South Dakota
 Red Iron! (1940 book), the story of a young civil engineer, set in the Depression, by Courtney Parmly Brown
Also: 
 Red Iron (Ma-za-sha), a Sioux Chief, signer of Treaty of Traverse des Sioux, and lifetime ambassador for peace who rescued hundreds of settlers taken captive in the Dakota War of 1862